The 1928 World Table Tennis Championships men's singles was the second edition of the men's singles championship.
Zoltán Mechlovits met compatriot Laszlo Bellak in the final of this event. The latter won 8–21, 18–21, 24–22, 21–12, 21–15.

Draw

Finals

References

-